Mount Prospect may refer to:

 Mount Prospect, Illinois, an incorporated village in Cook County, Illinois
 Mount Prospect Public Library
 Mount Prospect School District 57
 Mount Prospect station, a railroad station
 Mount Prospect (Leggett, North Carolina), a historic house
 Mount Prospect, a subordinate summit of Mount Greylock, located in Massachusetts
 Mount Prospect Baptist Church, Rock Hill, South Carolina
 Mount Prospect Methodist Church, Richland, Arkansas
 Mount Prospect Park, in Brooklyn, New York